Bob Davis  is an American sportscaster. He is best known for his work broadcasting Kansas City Royals baseball games as well as Kansas Jayhawks football and basketball games. Davis is known for his dramatic style and calling the Jayhawks' NCAA Tournament Championships in 1988 and 2008.

Broadcasting career
Bob Davis lived in Hays, Kansas and broadcast Fort Hays State University sports for radio station KAYS (AM) from 1968 to 1984 before becoming the play-by-play voice of the Kansas Jayhawks football and men's basketball teams, a position he held until 2016. In addition to his work on the KU broadcasts, Davis called Kansas City Royals baseball from 1997 to 2013. During his Royals tenure, he worked as the play-by-play analyst on television with Royals Hall of Fame pitcher Paul Splittorff for eleven years. Bob Davis worked for the NCAA-CBS Radio broadcasts of the NCAA Women's Final Four basketball tournament in 1990, 1992, and 1994 through 1997.

Personal life
Bob Davis grew up in Topeka, Kansas. Following graduation from Topeka West High School he attended Washburn University. He and wife Linda live in Lawrence, Kansas. Linda Davis is currently being treated for Parkinson's disease. Bob and Linda Davis' son, Steven, is a play-by-play announcer for the Double-A affiliate of the Royals and also broadcasts games for the UMKC Kangaroos men's basketball team.

Awards and honors
 13-time winner, Kansas Sportscaster of the Year Award.
 Member, Kansas Association of Broadcasters Hall of Fame (inducted 2006).
 Member, Fort Hays State University Hall of Fame.
 Two-time winner, Oscar Stauffer Award for excellence in high school sports.
 2001 named to Dick Vitale's "Sweet Sixteen" list of best college basketball broadcasters.

References

Living people
American radio sports announcers
College basketball announcers in the United States
College football announcers
Kansas City Royals announcers
Kansas Jayhawks football announcers
Major League Baseball broadcasters
People from Hays, Kansas
People from Lawrence, Kansas
Sportspeople from Topeka, Kansas
Washburn University alumni
Women's college basketball announcers in the United States
Year of birth missing (living people)